Dryochlora is a genus of moths in the family Geometridae. It was first described by David Stephen Fletcher in 1979.

Species
Dryochlora cinctuta (Saalmüller, 1891)
Dryochlora ophthalmicata Moore 1867

References

Geometrinae